Boban Nikolovski (Macedonian: Бобан Николовски; born 1 August 1977) is a Macedonian retired footballer who played as a midfielder.

Club career
After starting to play in his hometown club FK Kumanovo, he moved to Serbia where he played for most of his career. He played with top league clubs as FK Obilić, OFK Beograd, FK Sutjeska Nikšić, FK Železnik and FK Hajduk Beograd, but also with other clubs as, FK Bor, FK Rudar Bor, FK Železničar Beograd, FK Srem.

External links
 Profile at Srbijafudbal
 Nikolovski with FK Železnik at EUFO.de
 Profiles of 1998–99 2nd League players at Tripod

1977 births
Living people
Sportspeople from Kumanovo
Association football midfielders
Macedonian footballers
North Macedonia under-21 international footballers
FK Kumanovo players
FK Bor players
FK Obilić players
FK Sutjeska Nikšić players
OFK Beograd players
FK Železnik players
FK Železničar Beograd players
FK Srem players
FK Hajduk Beograd players
FK Radnički Niš players
First League of Serbia and Montenegro players
Macedonian expatriate footballers
Expatriate footballers in Serbia
Expatriate footballers in Serbia and Montenegro
Macedonian expatriate sportspeople in Serbia
Macedonian expatriate sportspeople in Serbia and Montenegro